The Oaks Park Roller Skating Rink is a roller rink at Oaks Amusement Park, in Portland, Oregon's Sellwood neighborhood, in the United States.

History

The rink opened in 1905 and represents the longest and richest story of a roller skating rink that survived the civil strife of the 1950-60s, development overtures and the musical whims of generations to become a rink gifted for perpetuity. Today, the Oaks Skating Rink remains America's largest and oldest under the umbrella of the Oaks Park Association, a nonprofit organization that manages both the rink and park attractions.

During the Great Depression, admission prices were reduced so families could better afford skating.  Additionally the park owner, Edward Bollinger, started the Junior Roller Skating Club which skated on Sunday afternoons.  This led to the largest number of active roller skaters ever at Oaks Park Skating Rink.

Built in a flood plain, in 1948, water damage from the same flood that destroyed Vanport required five months to repair. During rebuilding, engineers installed iron barrels under the rink floor so it could float above flooding waters in the future. A day later and after four hours of effort, they severed the floor supports to allow it to float.

Dale and Jeanne Pritchard were longtime instructors at the rink.

The rink has served as a location for several films and TV shows including Grimm, Portlandia, Leverage, Breaking In and Untraceable. In addition, the rink also appeared in Free Willy as the entrance to the tank where Willy was held.

In 2017, Damian Lillard and Adidas released a version of his "Dame 4" shoe, called "Glow in the Park", which was inspired by the rink.

Today, the Oaks Rink carries the tagline "Skaters Paradise" to accompany its 100 x 200 square foot (20,000 sq ft skating surface) Michigan maple floor and the last live Wurlitzer pipe organ to operate in a U.S. roller rink.

Organ

From 1905 until an organ was installed, a live orchestra played from the balcony above the skating rink.

In 1922, a William Woods (a local builder) theatre organ was installed.  It began as a 2/5:  two manuals and five ranks (rows of 61 pipes of similar timbre, each one a different size and pitch) and eventually became a 4/18.  It was moved to a military base's roller rink in 1955; as of 2003  it was in a private home in Newport, Oregon.  Some parts may have been retained at Oaks Park.

The current pipe organ was originally installed in 1926 at Portland's Broadway Theater, but had fallen into disuse since the early 1930s with the popularity of sound films.  It was relocated to Oaks Park skating rink in 1955.

The organ is described by Oregon Public Broadcasting's April Bauer as "an impossible-looking hulk the size of a semi truck, hanging about twenty feet above the rink floor". Keith Fortune has served as the rink's organist and "unofficial curator".

The rink is the world's only location where visitors can skate to music provided by a live pipe organ, as of 2009.

The Hangar
The roller rink has an annex, separate from the main rink, in a detached building roughly 200 feet east (and behind) the public rink.  The oval flat track is used by the Rose City Rollers (women's roller derby) for practice and some tournaments.

References

External links

 
 
 

1905 establishments in Oregon
Buildings and structures completed in 1905
Buildings and structures in Portland, Oregon
Roller skating rinks
Sellwood-Moreland, Portland, Oregon